Javier Sánchez is a Mexican developer and architect primarily known for contemporary construction in Mexico City, especially the Condesa neighborhood. Sánchez is the founding partner and lead designer of the Mexico City firm JSª, known as Higuera + Sanchez from 1996-2007. Obras magazine voted Sánchez one of the forty most influential architects of the past forty years.

Biography
Sánchez graduated with honors from the Universidad Nacional Autonoma de México (UNAM), and received his master's degree in Real Estate Development from Columbia University in New York City.

Sánchez was at the vanguard of market urbanism  in Mexico City. His firm, Higuera + Sánchez, bought a dilapidated warehouse in Condesa and created the city's first studio lofts, including communal space in the heart of the building. Such projects have been described as guerrilla architecture.

Projects (partial list)

Mexico City

The new wing of the Spanish Cultural Center(2011)
13 de Septiembre Adaptive Reuse Housing (2005) - featured in the 2005 New York show Mexico City Dialogues: New Architectural Practices, at the Center for Architecture
Hotel Condesa DF (2004)
Parque España, public spaces
 Torre Ámsterdam, a 19-storey tower at Avenida Insurgentes 301-303, not to be confused with the Torre Ámsterdam in Santa Fe, Mexico City
Additional works
Most are apartment/condominium complexes unless otherwise noted.

Condesa
Ámsterdam 127, 235, 315, 309, 322, Centro Qi gymnasium
Chilpancingo 17
Nuevo León 113
Parque México 39
Tacámbaro 36
Teotihuacán 15
Veracruz 60 and complex at 79-81-83-85-91

Roma
Chihuahua 78
Mérida 49
Río de Janeiro 64
Zacatecas 90

Other areas
Departamento Campos Elíseos
Departamento Portofino
Lamartine 336
Monte Casino
Museo del Estanquillo
Oficinas Apollo
Oficinas Bowker
Oficinas Rivera Gaxiola y Asociados
Parques Polanco apartments
Progreso 218
República de Cuba 41-43
Residencial Spartta
Sierra Mojada 355
Temístocles 12
Tres Picos
Universidad Claustro de Sorjuana

China
"Greenhouse" residences, Inner Mongolia

Peru
 El 22 Beach Housing, (2006) outside Lima - Winner of the Silver Medal of the XI Biennale of Mexican Architecture.

In addition, Sánchez has designed projects in Costa Rica, Panama, Colombia, in Munich, Germany, and pavilions at the Venice Biennale.

Academic commissions
University of Texas at San Antonio, Visiting Professor of Architectural Design in the Graduate Architecture Program for the 2013 spring semester
Universidad Nacional Autonoma de México (UNAM)
Instituto Tecnológico y de Estudios Superiores de Monterrey (ITESM)
University of Washington
Kansas State University, 2014-2015 Regnier Visiting Chair

Society memberships
Honorary Fellow of the American Institute of Architects

References

20th-century Mexican architects
Living people
21st-century Mexican architects
Year of birth missing (living people)